Goat is an Italian restaurant and cocktail bar at 333 Fulham Road in Chelsea, London, England.

It was originally a pub called the Goat, which in 1725 became the Goat in Boots. In 2013, it was renamed to "Goat".

References

External links
http://goatchelsea.com

Pubs in the Royal Borough of Kensington and Chelsea
Chelsea, London
Former pubs in London
Restaurants in the Royal Borough of Kensington and Chelsea